Abuda is a surname. Notable people with the surname include:

 Abuda (born 1986), Brazilian footballer
 Abuda (born 1989), Brazilian footballer
 Freddie Abuda (born 1969), Filipino basketball player